Enrique Jiménez (born 12 October 1944) is a Mexican wrestler. He competed at the 1968 Summer Olympics and the 1972 Summer Olympics.

References

External links
 

1944 births
Living people
Mexican male sport wrestlers
Olympic wrestlers of Mexico
Wrestlers at the 1968 Summer Olympics
Wrestlers at the 1972 Summer Olympics
Sportspeople from Oaxaca
Pan American Games medalists in wrestling
Pan American Games silver medalists for Mexico
Wrestlers at the 1975 Pan American Games
Medalists at the 1975 Pan American Games
20th-century Mexican people
21st-century Mexican people